Rubin "Rube" Lacy (or Lacey) (January 2, 1901 – November 14, 1969) was an American country blues musician, who played guitar and was a singer and songwriter.

Lacy was born in Pelahatchie, Mississippi, United States, and learned to play the guitar in his teens from an older performer, George Hendrix. Working out of the Jackson area in the Mississippi Delta, he became one of the state's most popular blues singers. His bottleneck style inspired that of the better-known performer Son House. In 1927, he recorded four songs for Columbia Records in Memphis, Tennessee, though none were released, and the masters do not survive.

In 1928, Lacy recorded two songs, "Mississippi Jail House Groan" and "Ham Hound Crave", for Paramount Records, which constitute his recorded legacy. Four years later he became a minister. He was later found living in Lancaster, California, by the blues researcher David Evans, who recorded him with his congregation. He died there on November 14, 1969.

References

Sources
 R. Crumb, Heroes of Blues, Jazz and Country

External links
Rubin Lacy on the Mississippi Blues Trail 

1901 births
1969 deaths
Country blues musicians
American blues singers
American blues guitarists
American male guitarists
Slide guitarists
Paramount Records artists
Songwriters from Mississippi
Singers from Mississippi
20th-century American singers
20th-century American guitarists
Guitarists from Mississippi
20th-century American male singers
American male songwriters